Staré Hrady is a municipality and village in Jičín District in the Hradec Králové Region of the Czech Republic. It has about 200 inhabitants.

Sights
Staré Hrady is know for the Staré Hrady Castle. It belongs to the most visited tourist destinations in the region. A Gothic fortress named Stará was first documented in 1340. It was rebuilt into the Renaissance castle in 1573. In 2007, it was purchased by a private owner who reconstructed the castle and opened it to the public.

References

Villages in Jičín District